Gugyeol, also kwukyel, is a system for rendering texts written in Classical Chinese into understandable Korean.  It was chiefly used during the Joseon Dynasty, when readings of the Chinese classics were of paramount social importance.  Thus, in gugyeol, the original text in classical Chinese was not modified, and the additional markers were simply inserted between phrases.  The Korean reader would then read the parts of the Chinese sentence out of sequence to approximate Korean (SOV) rather than Chinese (SVO) word order.  A similar system for reading classical Chinese is used to this day in Japan and is known as kanbun kundoku.

Gugyeol is derived from the cursive and simplified style of Chinese characters.

Etymology
The name gugyeol can be rendered as "phrase parting," and may refer to the separation of one Chinese phrase from another.  This name is itself believed to originate from the use of hanja characters to represent the Middle Korean phrase ipgyeot (입겿), with a similar meaning.  The gugyeol system is also sometimes referred to as to (토, 吐) or hyeonto (현토, 懸吐), since to is also used to refer to the morphological affixes themselves; or as seogui (석의, 釋義) which can be rendered as "interpretation of the classics."

History
Gugyeol is first attested from the 11th century in the early Goryeo dynasty, but evidence indicates it likely dates back to the 7th century or earlier.  In this period, certain hanja characters were used (along with specialized symbols) to represent Korean sounds through their meaning.  For example, the syllable '잇' (is) was represented with the hanja character 有, since that character has the Korean meaning '있다.'  This technique came to be replaced in the late Goryeo period with using hanja characters according to their sound.  This later version of the gugyeol system was formalized by Jeong Mong-ju and Gwon Geun around 1400 in the early Joseon Dynasty, at the behest of King Taejong.  At this time a number of Confucian classics, including the Classic of Poetry, were rendered into gugyeol.

The term gugyeol is often extended beyond this early system to similar uses of hangul following the introduction of the Hunminjeongeum in the 15th century.  In this respect, gugyeol remains in occasional use in contemporary South Korea, where such techniques are still sometimes used to render the Confucian classics into readable form.

Gugyeol should be distinguished from the idu and hyangchal systems which preceded it.  Gugyeol used specialized markings, together with a subset of hanja, to represent Korean morphological markers as an aid for Korean readers to understand the grammar of Chinese texts.  Also, the idu and hyangchal systems appear to have been used primarily to render the Korean language into hanja; on the other hand, gugyeol sought to render Chinese texts into Korean with a minimum of distortion.

Table of Gugyeol

See also
Hanja
Idu
Hyangchal
Hangul
Katakana
Kanbun

References

Further reading

External links
Doosan Encyclopedia entry
구결(口訣) - 한국민족문화대백과사전(Korean)

Korean writing system
Joseon dynasty
Goryeo